Yan Ping (Chinese: 闫平; born in 1956 in Jinan, Shandong, China), is a female oil painter in China. Yan Ping attended to Shandong University of Arts in 1979, graduated in 1983 and then stayed in Shandong University of Arts. In 1989, Yan Ping attended to the oil painting seminar class of Central Academy of Fine Arts (CAFA). She is now a professor of School of Arts, Renmin University of China, director of China Artists Association, director of China Oil Painting Society. Her work combines a sensibility of vitality with rationality, connecting art to life in the context of a female's individual perspective.

Artistic style 
Yan Ping’s painting style emphasizes color expression. The clear indoor light and bright colors drawn by her distinctive character strokes introduce something new to Chinese audiences, who are accustomed to heavy forms, and repressed emotions of art to feel the cheerful and clarity of humanity from art. Yan Ping's paintings give a warm and clear humanity to the stressful Chinese environment. The most frequent colors found in Yan Ping's oil paintings are rose pink and gemstone green. She uses them because they represent life, a reference to heme and chlorophyll as the source of life for animals and plants. The red and green colors symbolize a vitality of an endless force and emotion. Yan Ping has hopeful beliefs that for peace and compassion, but she encountered a devastating decade of the Cultural Revolution during her childhood. Thus, her value in beauty and romance were not with her at the time.  As a result, Yan Ping brought these feelings and thoughts about love alive in her artwork. Yan Ping’s works today are vivid, lively and romantic, which are dramatically opposite from her adolescent experiences.

Select works

Select works: 
From 1990 to 2016, Yan Ping had created a total of 208 oil paintings, the most famous of which is her Mother and Son series. She had held solo exhibitions in Beijing, Jinan and Hong Kong. She has published nine individual painting albums.

Exhibitions

Select solo exhibitions

Publications

Publications:

References 

1956 births
Living people
20th-century Chinese women artists
20th-century Chinese artists
Chinese women painters
Painters from Shandong